Sathiyo Chalyo Khodaldham is a 2014 Gujarati drama film directed by Samir Jagot and produced by Mihir Patel. The film is about a family who believes in Leuva Patel goddess Khodiyar.

Plot
A family of Karshanbhai Patel with his wife Shantaben, son Amar, daughter in law Arushi, daughter Ami is living happily. Not only family but their worker Raghu Kaka and Raghu’s wife Radha are also treated as family. Ami is center of family. She is too lively, she is very good dancer, she is heart of family. The story is centered around the family.

Cast 

 Apoorva Arora as Ami Patel
 Leena Jumani as Arushi Patel
 Ujjwal Rana as Amar Patel
 Sheela Sharma as Shantaben Patel
 Mukesh Rawal as Karshanbhai Patel
 Prasiddhi Mhatre as Dr. Madhavi
 Chaitainya Bhatt as Dr. Manoj
 Babul Bhavsar as Raghu Kaka
 Hemal Dave as Radha
 Milan Trivedi as Mamadiyo Charan
 Rupal Vasavada as Devalde

Production

Development 

Samir Jagot  - Director of the Movie has directed more than 50 Television advertisement. He has assisted Partho Ghosh, Krishna Raghav, Lekh Tandon, Shyam Benegal in movie Zubeiedaa  before this Movie.He was not agreed to direct Gujarati film but the way Gujarati  Film is going down he think to give better to Gujarati Cinema. 
The film was planned before two years but director Samir Jagot was not satisfied with story so writing process has taken this much long time. After a year started to work on casting. It was finished within three months.

Letter on Jayesh Tank and Kalpak Rupani has joined the team as executive producer. The film was too tough as it contain mythology and family drama both but production team of Ctrl S Entertainment has proved that they can arrange anything to make the film better. This is first Gujarati movie which has passed through DI process

Filming 

The filming begin in January 2014 in single schedule. Locations ware Shreeji Bungalow, Rathod Hospital, Ethnic Pharmaceutical and Khodaldham(Kagvad). The total schedule was 22 days including choreography. The entire Movie shot in Rajkot City , Lodhika Village and Kagvad Khodaldham. Camera, Editing, VFX, Animation all the kind of parameters are comparable with Bollywood Movies.

Soundtrack

References

External links
 

2014 films
2010s Gujarati-language films
Indian drama films
2014 drama films
Films about religion